USS Parrakeet (AMc-34) was a coastal minesweeper acquired by the U.S. Navy for the dangerous task of removing mines from minefields laid in the water to prevent ships from passing.

The first ship to be named Parrakeet by the Navy, AMc–34 was built in 1934 by Al Larson, Terminal Island, California, as the Jackie Sue; acquired by the Navy 14 November 1940; and placed in service 29 April 1941.

World War II service 

Parrakeet was assigned to harbor and coastal service along the California coast.

Deactivation 
 
Parrakeet was struck from the Naval Register 22 December 1944 and transferred to the War Shipping Administration for disposal 5 February 1945.

References

External links 
 NavSource Online: Mine Warfare Vessel Photo Archive - Parrakeet (AMc 34)

Ships built in Los Angeles
1934 ships
Minesweepers of the United States Navy
World War II minesweepers of the United States